Daniel Lyman (July 13, 1753 – November 3, 1809) was a political figure in New Brunswick. He represented York in the Legislative Assembly of New Brunswick from 1785 to 1792.

He was born in New Haven, Connecticut, the son of Deacon
Daniel Lyman, and was educated at Yale College, graduating in 1770. Lyman married Statira Camp in 1773. He served with the Prince of Wales's American Volunteers during the American Revolution, first as captain and later as major. After the war, Lyman settled in New Brunswick. He leased a farm on the Nashwaak River from Benedict Arnold. He later moved to England and died at home in Piccadilly, London at the age of 55.

References 

1753 births
1809 deaths
Politicians from New Haven, Connecticut
Loyalist military personnel of the American Revolutionary War
Members of the Legislative Assembly of New Brunswick
Colony of New Brunswick people
American emigrants to pre-Confederation New Brunswick
United Empire Loyalists
Military personnel from New Haven, Connecticut
Yale College alumni
Loyalists in the American Revolution from Connecticut